Decatur County Airport may refer to:

Greensburg-Decatur County Airport in Greensburg, Indiana, United States (FAA: I34)
Decatur County Industrial Air Park in Bainbridge, Georgia, United States (FAA: BGE)
Scott Field (Tennessee), also known as Decatur County Airport, a former airport in Parsons, Tennessee, United States (FAA: 0M1)